Potocari, Srebrenica may refer to:

Donji Potočari, near Srebrenica, Bosnia and Herzegovina
Gornji Potočari, near Srebrenica, Bosnia and Herzegovina
Srebrenica Genocide Memorial, commemorating victims of the 1995 Srebrenica massacre